The Baluba are one of the Bantu peoples of Central Africa. Their creator deity's name is Kabezya-Mpungu.

Creation myth of Kabezya-Mpungu
The Baluba creation story makes a connection between God's invisibility or unavailability and the endowment of humans with a soul or divine component longing for God.

In the creation story, Kabezya-Mpungu decides to become invisible after creating the world and the first humans who did not yet have a heart. After balancing the rain, sun, moon, and darkness, he leaves. To replace the visible god, he sends the people Mutshima ("heart"), the life-giving or divine part of humans.

{{quote|..I don't want that humans will see me any more. I return into myself and send Mutshima...Then Kabeza-Mpungu disappeared. Thereafter, the heart appeared, in a small, hand-sized vessel. The heart cried and turned towards Sun, Moon, Darkness and Rain: "Kabezya-Mpungu, our father, where is he!" "Father is gone, we don't know the way he went". "Oh how much I am longing to see him" the heart replied, "to talk to him. Since I cannot find him, I will enter into this man. So I will wander from generation to generation".}}

Since then all humans have been endowed with Mutshima, the heart.

Notes

References
 Carl Einstein (Ed.) 1925: Afrikanische Märchen und Legenden; Rowohlt, 1925. Neuausgabe (1980) MEDUSA Verlag Wölk + Schmid, Berlin. (in German)
 Carl Einstein. African Legends, First English edition, Pandavia, Berlin 2021. 
 Charlotte Leslau, Wolf Leslau (Ed.): African Folk Tales''; Mount Vernon, 1963, N.Y. : Peter Pauper Press

External links 
 Creation Myth of Kabezya-Mpungu

Bantu mythology
Creation myths